KQKD (1380 AM) is a radio station in Redfield, South Dakota (licensed to serve Redfield).  The station is licensed to Gray Ghost Broadcasting. It airs a full service format.

The station was assigned these call letters by the Federal Communications Commission on June 4, 1979.

History
On November 16, 1986, a fire destroyed a block of buildings in Redfield, including the studios of KQKD. Four other businesses were destroyed in the fire that left 20 people homeless and killed a 17-month-old girl. The wire story in the San Jose Mercury News included a note that the radio station was then celebrating its 25th anniversary.

In June 1997, station owner Roberts Radio of Pleasantville, New York, told the Aberdeen American News that old equipment at KQKD had been replaced in an effort to improve the sound of the station's programming.

In October 2004, KQKD was acquired by Aberdeen Radio Ranch Inc. (Robert J. Ingstad, co-president) from Robert E. Ingstad as part of a reorganization by the Ingstad family. This deal also included stations KGIM, KGIM-FM, and KNBZ-FM. The price for this four-station deal was undisclosed. According to Broadcasting & Cable, at this time KQKD carried a Country music/Talk radio format.

In November 2004, Aberdeen Radio Ranch reached separate agreements to sell KQAA-FM to the Educational Media Foundation, and KKAA (1560 AM) and KQKD (1380 AM) to Family Stations, Inc.

Effective October 31, 2017 Robert Ingstad's KKAA, LLC acquired KQKD and KKAA from Family Stations for $85,000. KKAA, LLC subsequently sold the station to sister company I3G Radio, LLC for $25,000 effective January 31, 2018.

On January 6, 2020, KQKD changed their format from classic hits to classic country, branded as "Pure Country 107.1 & 99.9".

On April 15, 2021, KQKD was acquired by Gray Ghost Broadcasting. The owners of Gray Ghost are Denise and Ron Schacht former owners of WDLS 93.7 of Dallas, Pennsylvania (now WSJR). KQKD was changed from a music intensive format to a full service station. While there is music, it is used as a fill in between features. The music is a combination of country, from the 60's through current and popular music from the 50's through the 90's without disco or rap. Special music programs are composed of Sunday morning hymns, a big band hour and the two hour syndicated Sounds of Sinatra. Farm markets and Dakota News Network are carried daily with a good deal of emphasis on farm and ranch news including Adams on Agriculture. The station also carries Red Eye Radio overnights, a few conservative talk shows at night, an outdoor show and garden shows. Additionally, local high school sports is broadcast, KQKD is the "Voice of the Redfield Pheasants". The station features several  local residents and representatives of local organizations to discuss items of interest to the listeners including local obituaries.

Since the only newspaper is a weekly, the radio station fills in the remainder of the week as a source of information. In a nutshell it is 1950's AM radio.  The AM station has a very large service area, an approximate 100 mile radius due to the excellent ground conductivity in eastern South Dakota 30. The FM translator operates at 250 watts and has a coverage radius of about 25 miles from the transmitter site.The studio is located at 620 Main St. in Redfield in Suite 8 of the Plaza.The transmitter is located approximately 1 mile north of Redfield near US route 281

References

External links
FCC History Cards for KQKD 

QKD